Nancy Fugate Woods is emerita professor in Biobehavioral Nursing and Health Informatics at the University of Washington. She previously served as the dean of the University of Washington's nursing program and as the president of the American Academy of Nursing.

Education and honorary degrees
Woods graduated with a B.S. from the University of Wisconsin-Eau Claire, an
M.N. from the University of Washington, and a Ph.D in epidemiology from the University of North Carolina, Chapel Hill.  She has received honorary doctorates from three institutions: the University of Pennsylvania, the University of Haifa, and 
Chiang Mai University.

Work
Woods has researched issues relating to women's health since the 1970s.  Her research has shed light on menstrual cycle symptoms and has given new insight into the role personal factors play in understanding menstrual symptoms. Woods also improved the understanding of the transition to menopause. Her research is credited with having "led the development of women's health as a field of study in nursing science." Woods currently teaches Women's Health Physiology, Research Design for Studying Therapeutics, and Women's Health Issues.  Woods is the author of several important books on women's healthcare including Culture, Society, and Menstruation,
Women's Healthcare in Advanced Practice Nursing, Human Sexuality in Health and Illness and
Nursing Research: Theory and Practice. Over the course of her career, Woods has served as the President of the American Academy of Nursing, President of the North American Menapause Society, President of the Society for Menstrual Cycle Research, and as Dean of the University of Washington's nursing program. She was also elected to the Institute of Medicine, National Academy of Sciences.

Award
In 2017, Woods was named a Living Legend of the American Academy of Nursing.

References

Living people
University of Wisconsin–Eau Claire alumni
Fellows of the American Academy of Nursing
American nurses
American women nurses
University of Washington faculty
Year of birth missing (living people)
Nursing school deans
Nursing educators
Nursing researchers
UNC Gillings School of Global Public Health alumni
University of Washington School of Nursing alumni
University of Wisconsin–Eau Claire alumni
American women academics
Women deans (academic)
American university and college faculty deans
21st-century American women